"Rules" is a song from KMFDM's 1996 album Xtort.  It was also released on a three track EP.

Track listing

1996 release

2009 7" reissue

Personnel
Sascha Konietzko - vocals, bass, synthesizers, programming, drums (3), production, mixing
Gunter Schulz - guitars, production, mixing
En Esch - solo-guitar (2)
Dorona Alberti - vocals (1)
Chris Connelly - vocals (3)
Mark Durante - slide guitars (2, 3)
Bill Rieflin - drums (1, 2)
Cheryl Wilson - vocals (2, 3)
Bruce Bendinger - voice-over (2)
Ron Lowe – drill & vacuum cleaner (1)

References

1996 singles
KMFDM songs
TVT Records singles
Songs written by Sascha Konietzko
1996 songs
Wax Trax! Records singles
Songs written by Mark Durante
Songs written by Günter Schulz